"Tell Me the Way" is a song by Italian group Cappella, released in 1995 via various European labels, as the first single from the group's third studio album, War in Heaven (1996). It features new singer Alison Jordan, who replaced Kelly Overett after she left the group. The song was a notable hit in many European countries, peaking at number eight in Italy, number 15 in Finland, number 17 in the UK and number 20 in the Netherlands. On the Eurochart Hot 100, it reached number 33.

Critical reception
In his weekly UK chart commentary in Dotmusic, James Masterton remarked that "Tell Me the Way", "no great departure from any of their previous hits", becomes their seventh Top 20 hit since 1989. Pan-European magazine Music & Media wrote that "as long as Cappella is around you can postpone Euro dance's funeral. The one-line chorus is simple but utterly effective, while the pumping synths will turn dancefloors into trampolines." James Hamilton from Music Weeks RM Dance Update described it as a "distinctive high-pitched title line chant". 

Track listing
 12" single, Italy (1995)"Tell Me the Way" (House Mix) – 5:50
"Tell Me the Way" (R.A.F. Zone Mix) – 6:48
"Tell Me the Way" (T.S.O.B. Mix) – 5:53
"Tell Me the Way" (Tekno Kingdom Mix) – 5:58                   

 CD single, UK (1995)"Tell Me the Way" (R.A.F. Zone Mix) – 6:53
"Move on Baby" (Armand Van Helden Mix) – 5:51
"U Got 2 Let the Music" (DJ Professor Mix) – 6:01
"Don't Be Proud" (CCQT Mix) – 6:03                   

 CD maxi, Australia (1995)"Tell Me the Way" (Radio) – 3:38
"Tell Me the Way" (House Mix - Extended) – 5:28
"Tell Me the Way" (House Mix - Radio) – 3:55
"Tell Me the Way" (T.S.O.B. Mix) – 5:53                  
"Tell Me the Way" (Mars Plastic Mix) – 6:40
"Tell Me the Way" (Prof-X-Or Club Mix) – 7:10

Official mixes and remixes

 “Tell Me the Way” (High Fashion Edit) 3:23 
 “Tell Me the Way” (House Mix) 5:28 
 “Tell Me the Way” (House Mix Edit) 3:55
 “Tell Me the Way” (Mars Plastic Mix) 6:40
 “Tell Me the Way” (Plus Staples Mix) 6:33
 “Tell Me the Way” (Prof-X-Or Club Mix) 7:10
 “Tell Me the Way” (Prof-X-Or Dub) 6:30

 “Tell Me the Way” (R.A.F. Zone Mix) 6:51
 “Tell Me the Way” (Ricky Montanari Ethos Mama Dub 1) 6:40
 “Tell Me the Way” (Ricky Montanari Ethos Mama Dub 2) 6:00
 “Tell Me the Way” (Tekno Kingdom Mix) 6:00
 “Tell Me the Way” (T.S.O.B. Mix) 5:53
 “Tell Me the Way” (T.S.O.B. Edit) 3:53  
 “Tell Me the Way” (Video Mix) 3:38Note:'

The French 2-Track and Maxi-singles list "No Rap" versions of the "House Edit/Mix" and "Tekno Kingdom Mix". However, these are identical to the standard "House Mix" and "Tekno Kingdom Mix" found on other CD singles.

Charts

Weekly charts

Year-end charts

References

 

1995 singles
Cappella (band) songs
Electronic songs
1995 songs
Songs written by Gianfranco Bortolotti
English-language Italian songs